Brayan Josué Cortés Fernández (born 11 March 1995) is a Chilean footballer that currently plays as goalkeeper for Primera División club Colo-Colo and the Chile national team.

Club career

Deportes Iquique
Born in Iquique, Chile, he played as goalkeeper since he was five and joined hometown Deportes Iquique youth set-up aged fourteen. He was promoted to the first adult team in 2013 and his professional debut came one year later on 30 March 2014, where conceded three goals in a 3–0 away loss with Ñublense.

After completing the 2013–14 with two appearances and a Copa Chile (as back-up), Cortés was chosen as the coming season first-choice keeper by Héctor Pinto after Rodrigo Naranjo injury. He played the tournament's first five matches, highlighting his performances against powerhouses Colo-Colo (2–0 loss) and Universidad de Chile (2–2 draw) that kept him some games more in the goal after returning the bench with Naranjo fully recovered.

He completed the 2014–15 season with eight appearances.

International career

Chilean under-20 team
Cortés participated for Chile U20 at the 2013 South American Youth Football Championship, where the U20s reached its qualification to 2013 FIFA U-20 World Cup. He played one game during the contest in a 3–2 group stage win over Paraguay, being chosen as the man of the match.

Prior the Youth World Cup held in Turkey, Cortés played some exhibition games, highlighting a 4–4 draw with Uzbekistan where he performed well during the ninety minutes and saved a shoot during the penalties which bring to Chile the victory. On 31 May 2015, Cortés was included by Mario Salas in the 23-man roster to face the category's World Cup.

In 2015, he was included again in a Chilean national under-20 team roster, after being nominated by Hugo Tocalli to the South American Youth Championship in Uruguay. Cortes played in the Estadio La Corregidora in Querétaro, Mexico for the Chile national team against Mexico.

Chile under-23 team
Despite he aged 27, he represented Chile at under-23 level in a 1–0 win against Peru U23 on 31 August 2022, in the context of preparations for the 2023 Pan American Games.

Honours

Club
Deportes Iquique
 Copa Chile (1): 2013–14

Colo-Colo

 Copa Chile (2): 2019, 2021
 Supercopa de Chile (2): 2018, 2022

References

External links
 

1995 births
Living people
People from Iquique
Chilean footballers
Chile international footballers
Chile under-20 international footballers
Chilean Primera División players
2013 South American Youth Championship players
Deportes Iquique footballers
Colo-Colo footballers
Association football goalkeepers
2019 Copa América players